The Good Place is an American fantasy comedy television series created by Michael Schur. The series aired for four seasons consisting of a total of fifty-three episodes on NBC from September 19, 2016, to January 30, 2020. It focuses on Eleanor Shellstrop (Kristen Bell), who arrives in the afterlife and is welcomed by Michael (Ted Danson) to "the Good Place", a highly selective Heaven-like utopia he designed. However, she realizes that she was sent there by mistake and must hide her morally imperfect behavior while trying to become a better and more ethical person. William Jackson Harper, Jameela Jamil, and Manny Jacinto co-star as fellow Good Place residents Chidi Anagonye, Tahani Al-Jamil, and Jason Mendoza, respectively, while D'Arcy Carden co-stars as Janet, an artificial being who assists the residents.

During its run, The Good Place received critical acclaim and earned many awards and nominations. The series was nominated for fourteen Primetime Emmy Awards, including two nominations for Outstanding Comedy Series and three nominations for Danson for Outstanding Lead Actor in a Comedy Series. It was also nominated for two Golden Globe Awards, including a nomination for Best Television Series – Musical or Comedy and a nomination for Bell for Best Actress – Television Series Musical or Comedy. In addition, the show was nominated for six Hugo Awards, winning four times for "The Trolley Problem", "Janet(s)", "The Answer", and "Whenever You're Ready". It was nominated for three Nebula Awards, winning one for "Whenever You're Ready", and for three Saturn Awards. In 2017, The Good Place was named by the American Film Institute as one of its top 10 television programs of the year, and in 2019, the show was honored with a Peabody Award for its contributions to entertainment.

Awards and nominations

Notes

Nominees for awards

Other

References

External links 
 

Awards and nominations
Good Place